Grecoman or Graecoman (Greek: Γραικομάνοι, Grekománoi, Bulgarian: Гъркомани, Garkomani, Macedonian: Гркомани, Grkomani, Romanian: Grecomani, Albanian: Grekomanë, Aromanian: Gricumanji) is a pejorative term used in Bulgaria, North Macedonia, Romania, and Albania to characterize Albanian–, Aromanian–, and Slavic–speaking people, who self-identify as ethnic Greeks. The term generally means "pretending to be a Greek" and implies a non-Greek origin. Another meaning of the term is fanatic Greek. The term is considered highly offensive to the Greek people. The "Grecomans" are regarded as ethnic Greeks in Greece, but as members of originally non-Greek, but subsequently Hellenized minorities, in the neighboring countries.

References

Sources

Cultural assimilation
Ethnic and religious slurs
Aromanians in Greece